Life expectancy for men in Northern Cyprus is 78 years and for women 83 years.

Health Care
Northern Cyprus has a public healthcare system which is available to all those who have social security insurance, and their partners and children.  Use of the accident and emergency departments is free to anyone.  2023 patients were sent for treatment in Turkey at public expense in 2010, 22% for cardiovascular disease and 16% for cancer treatment. There are also private hospitals and private polyclinics and it is possible for people to get treatment in the Republic of Cyprus.

Hospitals
The following is a list of notable hospitals in Northern Cyprus:
 Dr. Akcicek Devlet Hastanesi Hospital/Kyrenia General Hospital (Public), Kyrenia
 Barış Mental Hospital, in Lefkoşa
 Burhan Nalbantoglu State Hospital, Lefkoşa
 Cengiz Topel Hospital, in Lefke
 Cyprus Life Hospital, Lefkoşa
 Etik Hospital, in Lefkoşa
 Famagusta State Hospital
 Famagusta Life Hospital
 Girne University Hospital, a teaching hospital in Girne
 Hippocrateon Private Hospital, Egkomi
 Kamiloğlu Hospital, Girne
 Kolan British Hospital (Kyrenia), Nicosia
 Magusa Tip Merkezi Medical Centre Hospital (Cyprus Central Hospital), in Famagusta
 Medical Port Tunççevik Hospital, Girne
 Near East University Hospital, a teaching hospital in Lefkoşa
 NİS Hospital, in Lefkoşa and Famagusta
 Özel Başkent Hospital, in Lefkoşa

References

 
Northern Cyprus 
Hospitals in Northern Cyprus
Health care in Cyprus